Pyrgulina pirinthella is a species of sea snail, a marine gastropod mollusk in the family Pyramidellidae, the pyrams and their allies.

Distribution
This marine species occurs in the following locations:
 European waters (ERMS scope)
 Mediterranean Sea
 Mersin Bay

References

 Melvill J. C. (1910). Descriptions of twenty-nine species of marine Gastropoda from the Persian Gulf, Gulf of Oman, and Arabian Sea, dredged by Mr. F. W. Townsend, of the Indo-European Telegraph Service. Annals and Magazine of Natural History (8)6: 1-17

External links
 To CLEMAM
 To Encyclopedia of Life
 To World Register of Marine Species
 CIESM: Chrysallida pirintella (different spelling)

Pyramidellidae
Gastropods described in 1910
Gastropods of Europe